David Earl Burns (born July 3, 1958) is an American retired professional basketball player. He played college basketball for Navarro College and Saint Louis.

He was raised in Dallas, Texas, and attended South Oak Cliff High School. After two years at Navarro Junior College, Burns transferred to Saint Louis University.  In his two years at SLU, he averaged 19.4 and 21.4 points per game. He was conference co-MVP during his senior year. 

Burns was selected by the NBA’s New Jersey Nets in the 3rd round (49th pick overall) of the 1981 NBA Draft. He split the 1981–82 season with the Nets and Denver Nuggets, playing a total of 9 games.

Burns was inducted to the Navarro College athletic hall of fame in 2021.

References

External links
NBA stats @ basketballreference.com

1958 births
Living people
American men's basketball players
Basketball players from Dallas
Denver Nuggets players
Navarro Bulldogs basketball players
New Jersey Nets draft picks
New Jersey Nets players
Ohio Mixers players
Point guards
Saint Louis Billikens men's basketball players